The 107th Ohio Infantry Regiment, sometimes 107th Ohio Volunteer Infantry (or 107th OVI) was an infantry regiment in the Union Army during the American Civil War.  It was also known as the 5th German Regiment.

Service
The 107th Ohio Infantry was organized at Camp Taylor in Cleveland, Ohio, and mustered in for three years service on August 26, 1862, under the command of Colonel Seraphim Meyer.

The regiment was attached to the following:
 2nd Brigade, 3rd Division, XI Corps, Army of the Potomac, to December 1862.
 2nd Brigade, 1st Division, XI Corps, to July 1863.
 1st Brigade, 1st Division, XI Corps, to August 1863.
 1st Brigade, Gordon's Division, Folly Island, South Carolina, X Corps, Department of the South, to January 1864.
 2nd Brigade, Gordon's Division, Folly Island, South Carolina, Northern District, Department of the South, to February 1864.
 1st Brigade, Ames' Division, District of Florida, Department of the South, to April 1864.
 District of Florida, Department of the South, to October 1864.
 4th Separate Brigade, District of Florida, Department of the South, to November 1864.
 1st Brigade, Coast Division, Department of the South, to December 1864.
 3rd Separate Brigade, Department of the South, to January 1865.
 1st Separate Brigade, Northern District, Department of the South, to March 1865.
 1st Separate Brigade, District of Charleston, Department of the South, to July 1865.

Detailed service

The 107th OVI's detailed service is as follows (NOTE — Battles are Bolded, Italicized; campaigns are Italicized):

1862
 Moved to Covington, Ky., September 28.
 Duty in the defenses of Cincinnati, Ohio, until October 5, 1862.
 At Delaware, Ohio, October 5–12.
 Ordered to Washington, D.C., October 12.
 Duty in the defenses of Washington, D.C., until December 1862.
 March to Fredericksburg, Va.
 To support of Burnside December 8–15.

1863
 Burnside's 2nd Campaign, "Mud March," January 20–24, 1863.
 At Stafford Court House until April.
 Chancellorsville Campaign April 27-May 6. 
 Battle of Chancellorsville May 1–5. 
 Gettysburg Campaign June 11-July 24. 
 Battle of Gettysburg July 1–3. 
 Pursuit of Lee to Manassas Gap, Va., July 5–24
 Battle of Hagerstown, Md., July 11–13.
 Ordered to Department of the South and sailed for Folly Island, S.C., August 1.
 Siege operations against Fort Wagner, Morris Island, S.C., August 9-September 7.
 Picket and fatigue duty on Folly Island, S.C., and operating against Charleston, S.C., until February 1864.

1864
 Expedition to Johns and James Islands February 6–14.
 Moved to Jacksonville, Fla., February 23.
 Duty there and in the District of Florida until December.
 Skirmishing near Jacksonville May 1 and 28.
 Expedition from Jacksonville to Camp Milton May 31-June 3.
 Battle of Bloody Bridge July 5-7
 At Fernandina, Fla., July–August.
 Return to Jacksonville and duty there until December.
 Moved to South Carolina December 5.
 Battle of Deveaux Neck Dec 6-9
 Pocotaligo Bridge December 29.

1865
 Expedition to destroy Charleston & Savannah Railroad January 14–16, 1865.
 Battle of Enterprise February 5.
 Occupation of Charleston March 10.
 Potter's Expedition to Camden, S.C., April 5–25.
 Operations about Sumter and Statesburg April 9–15.
 Battle of Dingle's Mill, April 9, 1865
 Statesburg April 15.
 Occupation of Camden April 17.
 Boykin's Mills April 18.
 Denkin's Mills, Beech Creek, near Statesburg, and Battle of Swift Creek April 19.
 Provost duty at Georgetown and at Charleston until July.

Casualties
The regiment lost a total of 133 men during service; 3 officers and 54 enlisted men killed or mortally wounded, 2 officers and 74 enlisted men died of disease.

Commanders
 Colonel Seraphim Meyer
 Lieutenant Colonel Charles Mueller - commanded at the battle of Chancellorsville
 Captain John M. Lutz - commanded at the battle of Gettysburg

Notable members
 Private Henry S. Finkenbiner, Company D - Medal of Honor recipient for action at the Battle of Dingle's Mill, April 9, 1865

See also
 List of Ohio Civil War units
 Ohio in the Civil War

Notes

References

 
 
 
 Smith, Jacob. Camps and Campaigns of the 107th Regiment Ohio Volunteer Infantry (S.l.:  s.n.), 1910.  [reprinted in 2000]

External links
 Ohio in the Civil War: 107th Ohio Volunteer Infantry by Larry Stevens
 National flag of the 107th Ohio Infantry
 Guidon of the 107th Ohio Infantry
 107th Ohio Infantry monument at Gettysburg

Military units and formations disestablished in 1865
Units and formations of the Union Army from Ohio
1862 establishments in Ohio